Luniuska Delgado (born 21 November 2001) is a Venezuelan tennis player.

Delgado has a career high WTA singles ranking of 962, achieved on 24 September 2018. She also has a career high WTA doubles ranking of 603, achieved on 31 December 2018.

Delgado represents Venezuela in the Fed Cup.

References

External links
 
 
 

2001 births
Living people
Venezuelan female tennis players
21st-century Venezuelan women